The Battles Wharf Historic District comprises a portion of Battles Wharf, Alabama between Mobile Bay and U.S. Route 98. The area, also called Battles, is a narrow stretch of bayfront with long, deep lots accessible by shell-paved lanes. Houses in the area date from about 1842 to the present day, and are in a distinctive wood-frame cottage style with tall windows and broad porches. Many houses feature so-called "rain porches," deep shed-roofed screened porches attached to the main house and elevated on short masonry piers. The district includes 14 contributing structures and two non-contributing structures. The properties are linked by a public footpath that serves as a thoroughfare. The district has principally functioned as a summer retreat for residents of Mobile, Alabama.

The area was originally called Dadeville after the Robert Dade family who settled there in 1849. A resort hotel had been established in 1822 at Point Clear and the high shoreline overlooking Mobile Bay became a popular retreat. Several hotels were built in the 19th century. By the early 20th century the area had a school, a post office, an orphanage, several churches and two hotels. At about this time it became known as Battles, after the Battles family bought much of the property. The area declined from 1927 after a causeway was built across the bay to Mobile, taking traffic from the community.

Battles Wharf was placed on the National Register of Historic Places on April 28, 1988.

References

Historic districts on the National Register of Historic Places in Alabama
Victorian architecture in Alabama
Historic districts in Baldwin County, Alabama
National Register of Historic Places in Baldwin County, Alabama